John Michael Doran (May 20, 1910 — February 11, 1975) was a Canadian professional ice hockey player who played 98 games in the National Hockey League with the Detroit Red Wings, New York Americans, and Montreal Canadiens between 1933 and 1940. The rest of his career, which lasted from 1931 to 1943, was spent in various minor leagues. He was born in Belleville, Ontario.

Career statistics

Regular season and playoffs

External links

1910 births
1975 deaths
Buffalo Bisons (AHL) players
Canadian ice hockey defencemen
Detroit Red Wings players
Hershey Bears players
Ice hockey people from Ontario
Montreal Canadiens players
New Haven Eagles players
New York Americans players
Ontario Hockey Association Senior A League (1890–1979) players
Pittsburgh Hornets players
Providence Reds players
Quebec Castors players
Sportspeople from Belleville, Ontario